Conrad Nicholson Hilton Sr. (December 25, 1887 – January 3, 1979) was an American businessman who founded the Hilton Hotels chain. From 1912 to 1916 Hilton was a Republican representative in the first New Mexico Legislature, but became disillusioned with the "inside deals" of politics. He purchased his first hotel in 1919 for $40,000, the Mobley Hotel in Cisco, Texas, which capitalized on the oil boom. The rooms were rented out in 8 hour shifts. He continued to buy and sell hotels and eventually established the world's first international hotel chain. When he died in 1979, he left the bulk of his estate to the Conrad N. Hilton Foundation.

Early life
Hilton was born in San Antonio, in what was then the New Mexico Territory, to Norwegian-born Augustus Halvorsen Hilton (1854–1919) and Mary Genevieve Laufersweiler. He attended the Goss Military Academy (since renamed as the New Mexico Military Institute) and St. Michael's College (later called the Santa Fe University of Art and Design), and the New Mexico School of Mines (now New Mexico Tech). From 1912 to 1916 Hilton was a Republican representative in the first New Mexico Legislature, when the state was newly formed. Hilton became frustrated with the "bureaucracy, slowness, cheating, lying, and inside deals of politics", and in 1916 he refused to run for a fourth term, instead endorsing his longtime political ally, Quianu Robinson.

He served two years in the United States Army during World War I. After completing Officer Training School, he became a second lieutenant and served in Paris in the Quartermaster Corps. While Conrad was in France with the army after the war, his father was killed in a car accident.

The most enduring influence to shape Hilton's philanthropic philosophy beyond that of his parents was the Catholic Church and his sisters. He credited his mother with guiding him to prayer and the church whenever he was troubled or dismayed—from the boyhood loss of a beloved pony to severe financial losses during the Great Depression. His mother continually told him that prayer was the best investment he would ever make.

Career
As a young boy, Hilton developed entrepreneurial skills working at his father's general store in Socorro County, New Mexico, which was partially converted into a 10-room hotel. This was followed by varied experiences, including a stint as a representative in New Mexico's first State Legislature and a career decision to become a banker.

It was with the intention of buying a bank that he arrived in Texas at the height of the Texas oil boom. He bought his first hotel instead, the 40-room Mobley Hotel in Cisco, Texas, in 1919, when a bank purchase fell through. The hotel did such brisk business that rooms changed hands as often as three times a day, and the dining room was converted into additional rooms to meet the demand. He went on to buy and build hotels throughout Texas, including the highrise Dallas Hilton, opened in 1925; the Abilene Hilton in 1927; Waco Hilton in 1928; and El Paso Hilton in 1930. The first hotel outside of Texas that Hilton built was in 1939 in Albuquerque, New Mexico. Today it is known as the Hotel Andaluz. During the Great Depression, Hilton was nearly forced into bankruptcy and lost several of his hotels. Nevertheless, he was retained as manager of a combined chain, and eventually regained control of his remaining eight hotels.

Over the next decade, he expanded west to California and east to Chicago and New York, crowning his expansions with such acquisitions as the Stevens Hotel in Chicago (then the world's largest hotel, it was renamed the Conrad Hilton), and the fabled Waldorf-Astoria in New York. He formed the Hilton Hotels Corporation in 1946, and Hilton International Company in 1948.

During the 1950s and 1960s, Hilton Hotels' worldwide expansion facilitated both American tourism and overseas business by American corporations. It was the world's first international hotel chain, at the same time establishing a certain worldwide standard for hotel accommodations. In 1954, Hilton Hotels bought The Hotels Statler Company, Inc., for $111 million, then the world's largest real estate transaction. In all, Hilton eventually owned 188 hotels in 38 cities in the U.S., including the Mayflower Hotel in Washington, D.C., the Palmer House in Chicago, and the Plaza Hotel and Waldorf-Astoria in New York City, along with 54 hotels abroad. He later purchased the Carte Blanche Credit Company and an interest in the American Crystal Sugar Company, as well as other enterprises.

Hilton received honorary degrees from the University of Detroit (1953), DePaul University (1954), Barat College (1955), Adelphi College (1957), Sophia University, Tokyo (1963), and the University of Albuquerque (1975). Hilton's autobiography, Be My Guest, was published in 1958 by Prentice Hall. In 1966, Hilton was succeeded as president by his son Barron and was elected chairman of the board.

Personal life
In 1925, Hilton married Mary Adelaide Barron (1906–1966). They had three children, Conrad Hilton Jr., Barron Hilton and Eric Hilton, before divorcing in 1934.

In 1942, Hilton married actress Zsa Zsa Gabor. They had one child, Francesca Hilton, before divorcing in 1947. Gabor wrote in her 1991 autobiography One Lifetime Is Not Enough that she became pregnant by Hilton only after he raped her during their marriage. Their daughter Francesca died in 2015, at age 67, from a stroke.

In 1976, Hilton married Mary Frances Kelly. Their marriage lasted until his death three years later in 1979.

Hilton bought Casa Encantada on 10644 Bellagio Road in Bel Air, Los Angeles, in 1950 and occupied the house until his death in 1979. Hilton described his enchantment with the house as "...a case of love at first sight...I couldn't resist it, one of the fabulous houses of the world". He renamed the property the Casa Encantada ("enchanted  house").

On January 3, 1979, Hilton died of natural causes at the age of 91. He was interred at Calvary Hill Cemetery, a Catholic cemetery in Dallas, Texas. He left US$500,000 to his two surviving sons, US$100,000 to his daughter Francesca, and US$10,000 to each of his nieces and nephews.

Hilton family fortune
In 1969, James C. Taylor presented plans to build a hospitality college on the campus of the University of Houston to Barron Hilton. Barron then presented the plans to Hilton, who donated US$1.5 million (equivalent to $ million in ) for the completion of the project. The Hilton College of Hotel and Restaurant Management opened to students in September 1969.

The bulk of his estate was left to the Conrad N. Hilton Foundation, which he established in 1944. His son, Barron Hilton, who spent much of his career helping build the Hilton Hotels Corporation, contested the will, despite having left the company as acting President, Chief Executive Officer, and Chairman of the Board of Directors. A settlement was reached and, as a result, Barron Hilton received 4 million shares of the hotel enterprise, the Conrad N. Hilton Foundation received 3.5 million shares, and the remaining 6 million shares were placed in the W. Barron Hilton Charitable Remainder Unitrust. Upon Barron Hilton's death, Unitrust assets were transferred to the Hilton Foundation, of which Barron previously served on the Board of Directors as Chairman.

In 1983, the Hilton Foundation donated US$21.3 million (equivalent to $ million in ) to expand facilities and increase endowment. That gift led to the construction of the South Wing, which opened in 1989 and added  of education and meeting space to Hilton College.

On December 25, 2007, Barron Hilton announced that he would leave about 97% of his fortune, then estimated at US$2.36 billion (equivalent to $ billion in ), to a charitable unitrust that would eventually be merged with the Conrad N. Hilton Foundation. By leaving his estate to the Foundation, Barron not only donated the fortune he had amassed on his own, but also returned to the Conrad N. Hilton Foundation the Hilton family fortune amassed by his father, which otherwise would have gone to the Conrad N. Hilton Foundation 30 years earlier, had Barron not contested his father's will.

Legacy

 The Conrad N. Hilton Foundation was established in 1944 by Conrad N. Hilton. Its mission is the alleviation of human suffering worldwide.
 Conrad N. Hilton Humanitarian Prize created in 1996 by The Conrad N. Hilton Foundation.
 The Conrad N. Hilton College is a hospitality college of the University of Houston named after Conrad Hilton.
 The Conrad N. Hilton Library at the Hyde Park campus of the Culinary Institute of America.
 The Conrad N. Hilton Chair in Business Ethics, The Hilton Distinguished Entrepreneur Award, and the Conrad N. Hilton Endowed Chair of Entrepreneurship at the College of Business Administration Loyola Marymount University.
 In 2009, actor Chelcie Ross played the role of Conrad "Connie" Hilton in the television show Mad Men for 6 episodes.

Autobiographies
 Be My Guest: Autobiography of Conrad Hilton (Prentice-Hall, Inc. 1958)
 Inspirations of an Innkeeper (privately printed, 1963)

Citations

Sources 
 Alef, Daniel. Conrad N. Hilton: Reveled in Hotel Deals (Titans of Fortune Publishing, 2009)
 Bolton, Whitney. The Silver Spade; the Conrad Hilton Story. with a foreword by Conrad Hilton (New York: Farrar, Straus and Young, 1954)
 Comfort, Mildred Houghton. Conrad N. Hilton, Hotelier (Minneapolis: T.S. Denison & Company, Inc., 1965)
 Dabney, Thomas Ewing. The Man Who Bought the Waldorf: The Life of Conrad N. Hilton (Duell Sloan & Pearce, 1950)
 Oppenheimer, Jerry. House of Hilton: From Conrad to Paris: A Drama of Wealth, Power, and Privilege (Three Rivers Press. 2007)
 Hilton, Conrad N. Be My Guest (Englewood Cliffs: Prentice-Hall, Inc., 1958)

External links
 Biography: Conrad Hilton, The Innkeeper to The World (Video)
 Conrad N. Hilton College at University of Houston
 Conrad Hilton's Secret of Success
 Conrad Hilton, Collector of Hotels (New York Times Magazine, 1949)
 Innkeeper to the World (Time, 1963)
 The Key Man (Time, 1949)
 Waldorf-Astoria as Hotels No. 16 (Time, 1949)
 Conrad N. Hilton Foundation
 San Angelo's Heartbreak Hotel History of second Hilton hotel built in San Angelo, TX in 1928, and Conrad Hilton's bankruptcy (San Angelo Live!, 2007)
 Mad Men: See the Real Conrad Hilton– image slideshow by Life
 Conrad N. Hilton early life in New Mexico

|-
!colspan="3" style="background:#C1D8FF;"| Husband of a Gabor sister

1887 births
1979 deaths
20th-century American businesspeople
American autobiographers
American hoteliers
American people of German descent
American people of Norwegian descent
American real estate businesspeople
American socialites
Catholics from New Mexico
Conrad Hilton family
Hilton Hotels & Resorts hotels
Hilton Worldwide
Republican Party members of the New Mexico House of Representatives
New Mexico Institute of Mining and Technology alumni
New Mexico Military Institute alumni
People from Socorro, New Mexico
Royal Canadian Geographical Society fellows
Santa Fe University of Art and Design alumni
United States Army officers
United States Army personnel of World War I